"Gump" is a song by American musical parodist "Weird Al" Yankovic. It is a parody of "Lump" by alternative rock group The Presidents of the United States of America and also parodies the 1994 movie Forrest Gump. It is one of a handful of Yankovic songs describing the events of a movie, such as "Jurassic Park" and "The Saga Begins" and currently the only one parodied from a then-recent song.

The cover for the single is itself a parody of the Presidents of the United States of America's debut album cover. This is one of Yankovic's shortest album parodies, second only to his remade version of "My Bologna" (a parody of The Knack's "My Sharona"). In the video for this song, Yankovic dons a bald cap. The Presidents of the United States of America themselves praised the parody and has since often referred to the "Weird Al" song during live performances.

Comedian Brian Posehn recorded a skit for his 2020 comedy metal album Grandpa Metal called "My Phone Call with Weird Al", featuring Yankovic, in which Posehn seeks Yankovic's permission to record a parody called "Trump" about the then-current POTUS Donald Trump, and gets infuriated when Yankovic informs him of the band who wrote the original hit to which Posehn responds "and Sinbad did a genie movie that not even Sinbad remembers".

Track listing
 "Gump" – 2:10
 "Spy Hard" – 2:49
 "Since You've Been Gone" – 1:22
 "Since You've Been Gone" (Karaoke Version) – 1:22
 "Callin' in Sick" (Instrumental) – 3:40
 "Spy Hard" (Instrumental) – 2:49
 "Spy Hard" (Orchestral Mix) – 2:49

Production
The song was recorded on January 3, 1996 at Santa Monica Sound Recorders, in Santa Monica, California. Before "Gump" was officially released, Yankovic played a rough version of the song for the Presidents of the United States of America on their tour bus. This marks the first time that Al was able to "see a band's reaction when they heard their parody for the first time." PUSA frontman Chris Ballew said he first heard Yankovic was doing his song on television, and later became friends with the parodist. Yankovic even directed a music video for the band's song "Mixed Up S.O.B." in 2008, and has joined them on stage a few times.

Music video

The music video for "Gump" is a double parody of both the movie Forrest Gump and the Presidents of the United States of America's music video for "Lump". The single's cover art is directly taken from the video shoot.
 The video begins with a feather blowing through the air, much like the beginning of the original movie.
 Andy Comeau appears as the titular character, Forrest Gump.
 Yankovic appears as Chris Ballew, complete with bald head.
 Jon "Bermuda" Schwartz appears as Jason Finn, and Steve Jay appears as Dave Dederer. Yankovic has stated that originally his guitarist, Jim West, was supposed to play the part of Dederer, but his hair was too long. Jay later filled in.
 Throughout the video Forrest offers different people chocolates. He first offers Gladys Ormphby (Ruth Buzzi's Laugh-In character) some chocolates and she hits him with her purse. The second offer is to Henry Reichenbach who is portrayed to be a stereotypical biker which results in Gump being spun around by his head. He then offers Pat Boone some chocolates. Boone greedily devours most of the box.
 The instruments used in the song are over-simplified as a parody of the Presidents of the United States of America's actual instruments (a basitar, or 2 stringed guitar for bass, and a guitbass, which is a 3 stringed guitar). Al uses a one stringed bass in the video, while the guitarist uses a two stringed "guitar".
 In the instrumental break of the song, it shows Forrest running (a parody of the scene where Forrest runs all around the country) across the street, in a horse race, and outer space. As he runs in the street again, he suddenly bumps into a pole and falls down to the ground, as the song says, "Run...stop!" 
 As mentioned before, half of the music video is also a parody of the "Lump" music video: Instead of singing in a bog/marsh, Al and his band are dancing in the water fountain in the middle of the park. The silhouette scene in the "Lump" music video is also parodied, with Al and his band making hand shadows against the background.
 At 1:04, during the silhouette scenes, Yankovic can be seen bending his guitar. This is similar to the videos for "Smells Like Nirvana" and "Money for Nothing/Beverly Hillbillies*."
 Gump is digitally edited into existing footage tapping John F. Kennedy on the shoulder, standing behind Richard Nixon and waving to the camera, and roasting hot dogs at an atomic bomb drop, just like the movie which edited Gump into several newsreels so he appeared to be interacting with historical figures.
 The song ends with, "And that's all I have to say about that", which is the way Forrest Gump often ends his stories. Afterwards, the Presidents of the United States of America followed Weird Al's example and ended performances of "Lump" with that quote and they still continue to do so.

Chart positions

See also
 List of singles by "Weird Al" Yankovic
 List of songs by "Weird Al" Yankovic

References

External links
 "Weird Al's" Official website
 Al's Official MySpace page
 Music video for "Gump" on YouTube

1996 singles
1996 songs
Music videos directed by "Weird Al" Yankovic
Scotti Brothers Records singles
Songs about fictional male characters
Songs with lyrics by "Weird Al" Yankovic
Songs written by Chris Ballew
"Weird Al" Yankovic songs